is the 12th CD released by Twins. It consists of 2 disc. Disc one is an EP, named A Year to Remember, for Boy'z, which has the similar style as Twins and both of them are artists from Emperor Entertainment Group (EEG).  

Disc 2 is specially made for the Chinese New Year. The song "() is a greeting song for the Chinese New Year,

CD Contents

Disc 1
Computer Data,Not Playable
" (Music Video)
 
"Girls"
"  (featured by Kenny Kwan)
" 
" 
"  (featured by Boy'z and Twins)

Disc 2
Computer Data,Not Playable
"  (Music Video)
" 
"  
" 
" 
"

References

2004 compilation albums
Twins (group) compilation albums